Women's Equality Day is celebrated in the United States on August 26 to commemorate the 1920 adoption of the Nineteenth Amendment (Amendment XIX) to the United States Constitution, which prohibits the states and the federal government from denying the right to vote to citizens of the United States on the basis of sex. It was first celebrated in 1971, designated by Congress in 1973, and is proclaimed each year by the United States President.

History
The date was chosen to commemorate the day in 1920 when the Secretary of State Bainbridge Colby signed the proclamation granting American women the constitutional right to vote. In 1971, following the 1970 nationwide Women's Strike for Equality, and again in 1973, as the battles over the Equal Rights Amendment continued, Congresswoman Bella Abzug of New York introduced a resolution to designate August 26 as Women's Equality Day.

In 1972, President Richard Nixon issued Proclamation 4147, which designated August 26, 1972, as "Women's Rights Day" and was the first official proclamation of Women's Equality Day.  On August 16, 1973, Congress approved H.J. Res. 52, which stated that August 26 would be designated as Women's Equality Day and that "the President is authorized and requested to issue a proclamation in commemoration of that day in 1920 on which the women in America were first guaranteed the right to vote". The same day, President Nixon issued Proclamation 4236 for Women's Equality Day, which began, in part: "The struggle for women's suffrage, however, was only the first step toward full and equal participation of women in our Nation's life. In recent years, we have made other giant strides by attacking sex discrimination through our laws and by paving new avenues to equal economic opportunity for women. Today, in virtually every sector of our society, women are making important contributions to the quality of American life. And yet, much still remains to be done".

, every president since Richard Nixon has issued a proclamation each year designating August 26 as Women's Equality Day.

See also
 Gender equality
 Gender inequality
 Timeline of women's suffrage
 List of observances in the United States by presidential proclamation

Other holidays honoring women
 Rosa Parks Day (February 4 / December 1)
 National Girls and Women in Sports Day (one day first week of February)
 Susan B. Anthony Day (February 15)
 International Women's Day, (March 8)
 Harriet Tubman Day (March 10)
 Helen Keller Day (June 27)
 National Women's Day in South Africa (August 9)

References

External links

Presidential Proclamations of Women's Equality Day by decade

 1970s: 1972 (called Women's Rights Day), 1973, 1974, 1975, 1976, 1977, 1978, 1979, 1980
 1980s: 1981, 1982, 1983, 1984, 1985, 1986, 1987, 1988, 1989, 1990
 1990s: 1991, 1992, 1993, 1994, 1995, 1996, 1997, 1998, 1999, 2000
 2000s: 2001, 2002, 2003, 2004, 2005, 2006, 2007, 2008, 2009, 2010
 2010s: 2011, 2012, 2013, 2014, 2015, 2016, 2018

19th Amendment
 National Archives – 19th Amendment

August observances
Observances in the United States
Second-wave feminism
Women in the United States
1973 establishments in the United States